Toledo, cruce de destinos, or simply Toledo, is a Spanish historical drama television series, set in 13th-century Toledo. It aired on Antena 3 in 2012.

Premise 
The fiction follows the intrigues in the court of Alfonso X the Wise in late 13th-century Toledo as well as it attempts to depict the historical postulate about the so-called "Convivencia of the Three Cultures".

Cast 
 Juan Diego as King Alfonso, the Wise.
 Patricia Vico as Violante, Alfonso's queen consort.
 Maxi Iglesias as Martín Pérez de Ayala, Rodrigo Pérez de Ayala's son.
  as Rodrigo Pérez de Ayala.
 Fernando Cayo as the Count of Miranda.
 Rubén Ochandiano as Archbishop Oliva.
  as Fernando.
  as Sancho, first born son of King Alfonso.
 Álex Angulo as Abraham, a Jewish merchant.
 Paula Rego as Fátima, Taliq.
  as Diana, queen's first lady.
 Beatriz Vallhonrat as Blanca, Rodrigo Pérez de Ayala's daughter.
  as Cristóbal, Martín's friend.
 Daniel Holguín as Abu Bark, a Muslim warrior.
 Mario Vedoya as Taliq, leader of the Muslim community in Toledo.
 Petra Martínez as Elvira, a servant working for Rodrigo Pérez de Ayala, Cristóbal's mother.
 Elena Rivera as Beatriz de Suma Carrera.
  as Humberto Miranda, only son of the Count of Miranda.

Production and release 
Toledo, cruce de destinos was created by Emilio Díez. The screenplay was authored by Díez together with Alberto Úcar. Álex Conrado composed the musical score. Most of the series was shot in Pedraza, the Castle of Guadamur and the Antena 3 sets in Madrid, whereas the only real shots in the city of Toledo consisted of the outdoor shots of the Puente de Alcántara. Produced by Boomerang TV for Antena 3, the first episode premiered on 10 January 2012. The broadcasting run ended on 3 April 2012. While the average viewer figures for the season (13.5% audience share) ended up being slightly above the channel's average, the series was not renovated for a second season.

Critical reception 
The historical depiction of Toledo was bashed by historians, while former mayor of Toledo  wrote in a column he felt "embarrassed" after watching a few episodes. In addition, critics also pointed out the "gratuitous" switch of the characters of Sancho and Fernando, when Fernando was the heir-apparent instead of the younger infante, as well as the condition of bastard of Sancho, and other historical anachronisms (loose hair instead of hair up for most women, the horizontal companionship between an heir apparent and his servants, errors in the representation of medieval women, Jews not abiding to kosher, soldiers "in uniform" or anachronical swords, to name a few).

References 

2010s Spanish drama television series
Television shows filmed in Spain
Television series set in the 13th century
2012 Spanish television series debuts
2012 Spanish television series endings
Spanish-language television shows
Antena 3 (Spanish TV channel) network series
Television series by Boomerang TV
Toledo, Spain in fiction